Harbin Engineering University (HEU) was founded in 1953 in Harbin, China. 

Designated as a Double First Class University and a former Project 211 university, HEU is aim to become top institution for engineering and marine fields. It is also included in the Double First-Class University Plan designed by the central government of China .

HEU offers more than 150 degree programs, whereby 48 are conducted in English.

History 
HEU traces its origins to the PLA Military Engineering Institute established in Harbin on September 1, 1953, with technical support from the Soviet Union after the Korean War. In 1966, the university became a local and non-military university and was renamed Harbin Engineering College. In 1970 the old university was however dismissed due to the tension at the border with the then Soviet Union. The major part of the old university, including university-level administration, was moved inland to Changsha, Hunan Province. A few other departments were also moved inland but to other places. The part that remained in Harbin formed a new university and was renamed as Harbin Shipbuilding Engineering Institute (HSEI).

The current name has been in use since 1994.

HEU was one of the first universities authorized by the state to award master and doctoral degrees.

Campus 

HEU is located in Nangang, in the heart of Harbin.

The university library occupies a six-story building on the eastern side of campus. Particular strengths of library collections focus on nuclear and marine science.

Wi-Fi access at the library is charged at 0.30 RMB per hour. Faculty, students, and staff with a university ID card may register for wifi access at the second-floor information desk.

Admissions
Undergraduate, master and doctoral students are admitted in the autumn semester. Although the majority of undergraduate courses are taught in Chinese, many postgraduate programs are offered in English. Qualifications in related programs are required for postgraduate admissions.

International Students
HEU emphasizes the development of international cooperation and academic exchange. Since 2000, HEU have international students from Canada, Korea, Russia, Japan, Pakistan, Philippines, Mongolia, Thailand, Nepal, India, United Kingdom, and United States.

Academics

The university awards undergraduate, master, and doctoral degrees in the various branches of engineering, science, literature, management, and economics. The university is especially known for its vessel engineering industries.

International students seeking to improve their Chinese-language proficiency may enroll in a non-degree language course in either autumn or spring.

Research
As scholars at national key university, HEU faculty prioritize engineering in shipbuilding, information and communications, nuclear power, and hydroacoustics.

HEU is one of the Seven Sons of National Defence.

The university is home to more than 40 research centers and institutes including:

 Nuclear Power Safety and Simulation Introduction Base
 Deepwater Engineering Research Center

International cooperation
The university has established relationships with more than 20 international universities and research institutions, coordinating visiting scholars and cooperative research  
development.

References

External links
Official website 
Official website 
Official website 
International Students website
Library website

 
Universities and colleges in Heilongjiang
Universities and colleges in Harbin
Project 211
Educational institutions established in 1953
1953 establishments in China